Flying cash, or Feipiao, was a type of paper negotiable instrument used during China's Tang dynasty invented by merchants but adopted by the state. Its name came from their ability to transfer cash across vast distances without physically transporting it. It is a precursor to true banknotes which appeared during the Song dynasty.

According to the New Book of Tang, in the year 804, merchants were using flying cash. Between 805 and 820 there was a shortage of copper cash coins which proved to be a hindrance for daily business transactions in the Tang dynasty. The creation of the flying cash happened after a tax reform that allowed for the partial acceptance of taxes in money, which had increased the demand for currency which scared the government that merchants would remove cash coins from the capital to circulate so they ordered the local governments to set up monetary systems based on silk, other fabrics, and daily items akin to barter which hampered long-distance trade in the Tang dynasty and harmed the national economy. The people that had the largest benefit from the introduction of flying cash were tea merchants and these merchants helped improve the trade between the capital and the regions.

Originally the government of the Tang dynasty was less than receptive to the idea of bills of exchange and had attempted banning them on multiple occasions, but in 812 flying cash were officially accepted as a valid means of exchange. After the government had accepted these bills the supervision of flying cash was handled by the Ministry of Revenue (戶部), the Tax Bureau (度支司), and the Salt Monopoly Bureau (鹽錢司). The state began printing their own notes. Flying cash would remain in use until the early period of the Song dynasty.

Origin 
Between the years 618 and 758 the Chinese salt monopoly was controlled by local governments as opposed to the imperial government, this system was known as the Kaizhong policy, the local governments didn't produce the salt themselves but taxed it. In the year 758 the government official Liu Yan had convinced the imperial government to actively enforce its salt monopoly again. This was known as the Zhece policy. Under the Zhece policy Chinese merchants were paid in salt certificates in exchange for supplying the frontier armies directly as opposed to transporting government provisions to them. During the reign of the Emperor Xianzong the supply of cash coins in circulation was scarce and when Chinese merchants would travel to the capital city, the merchants would entrust their money to the representative offices of their local governments, to the various armies of the Tang dynasty, government commissioners, and local rich families. The merchants did this to lighten their traveling burdens as they would hurry away in all directions. When the tallies were matched at a local office, they could withdraw their money.

Use 

Flying cash was never originally meant to be used as legal tender and, therefore, their circulation was limited. However, since they could be exchanged for hard currency at the capital with an exchange fee of 100 wén per 1000 wén, they were traded amongst merchants as if they were currency. Flying cash continued to be used in the Five Dynasties era into the beginning of the Song Dynasty in 960.

It was not until the Song dynasty and subsequent Jin occupation that paper money was officially established as a legal tender. Eventually, the Song Dynasty began to issue more notes to pay its bills- a practice that ultimately contributed to runaway inflation.

See also

 Hawala
 Fiat currency
 Economic history of China (Pre-1911)
 Economic history of China (1912–1949)
 Economy of China

References

Sources 

 Kang Guohong (康國宏) (1997). "Feiqian (飛錢)", in Men Kui (門巋), Zhang Yanqin (張燕瑾), ed. Zhonghua guocui da cidian (中華國粹大辭典) (Xianggang: Guoji wenhua chuban gongsi), 104. (in Chinese)
 Yao Enquan (姚恩權) (1993). "Feiqian (飛錢)", in Shi Quanchang 石泉長, ed. Zhonghua baike yaolan (中華百科要覽) (Shenyang: Liaoning renmin chubanshe), 85. (in Chinese)
 Zhou Fazeng (周發增), Chen Longtao (陳隆濤), Qi Jixiang (齊吉祥), ed. (1998). Zhongguo gudai zhengzhi zhidu shi cidian (中國古代政治制度史辭典) (Beijing: Shoudu shifan daxue chubanshe), 362. (in Chinese)

Currencies of China
Tang dynasty
Banknotes
Medieval currencies
Economy of the Tang dynasty